Our Endangered Values: America's Moral Crisis is a book written by Jimmy Carter. On January 15, 2006 it was listed at #1 on The New York Times Non-Fiction Best Seller list.

Carter won the Grammy Award for Best Spoken Word Album for the spoken word production of this book, tying with Ruby Dee and Ossie Davis.

References

External links
After Words interview with Carter on Our Endangered Values, November 6, 2005

Books by Jimmy Carter
2006 non-fiction books
Grammy Award for Best Spoken Word Album
Books written by presidents of the United States